The 2011 season marked the 104th season in which the Richmond Football Club participated in the AFL/VFL. This season was Damien Hardwick's second season as senior coach. It was also the first season Richmond played against the Gold Coast, and was also the first time the club played a home-and-away game at Cazaly's Stadium in Cairns.

Season summary
The start of the 2011 season was hopeful for the Tigers. In round 1, the Tigers were in front at three quarter time, to lose by 20 points to Carlton in the traditional blockbuster. Media commentators and AFL fans alike noted Richmond's improvement. In round 2, the Tigers shocked the AFL world when they drew with grand finalists from the previous year, St Kilda, even with their goal kicking star Jack Riewoldt going down with a concussion in the first quarter.

In rounds 3 and 4, the Tigers suffered significant losses to Hawthorn and Collingwood, but showed promise in their fightback in the third quarter against Collingwood. Their breakthrough came in round 5, when they beat North Melbourne at Etihad Stadium in front of a packed crowd. This started a good run for the Tigers. Richmond defeated Brisbane in round 6, then Fremantle in round 7. This put them just outside the Top 8. They had a narrow loss to the Western Bulldogs in round 8.

In round 9, the Tigers had a big win against Essendon in the traditional "Dreamtime at the G" match after going in the underdogs. The crowd of over 80,000 people were treated to an intense game, with Richmond coming out victorious.

Richmond then had a complete form turn around, with a 15-point loss against bottom-ranked Port Adelaide in Alice Springs after the club decided to host the home game match interstate, a decision that was roundly questioned by fans and the media.  The bye followed, then another loss to Sydney. Richmond then had a return to form, beating Brisbane at the Gabba.

Richmond's poor form continued, with straight losses to Melbourne, Carlton, Essendon, Gold Coast and Geelong. The Tigers got a badly needed bye in round 19 and then travelled to Perth in round 20 to face the West Coast Eagles where they were beaten.

Richmond had a win against Sydney in round 21 and then also won their next two games, against Melbourne and Adelaide, but lost their round 24 match to North Melbourne.

2010 off-season list changes

Retirements and delistings

Trades

Note: All traded picks are indicative and do not reflect final selection position

National draft

Preseason draft

Rookie draft

2011 squad

2011 season

Pre-season

Richmond was to have played an exhibition match against the Indigenous All-Stars on 4 February, but the match was cancelled. The match was originally to have been played at TIO Stadium in Darwin, but monsoonal rain made the surface unplayable; the league worked to move the game to Traeger Park in Alice Springs, but after concerns that either the match or the transport of players into and out of Alice Springs could have been affected by Cyclone Yasi, the match was cancelled altogether.

NAB Cup

Home and away season

Ladder

Awards

League awards

All-Australian team

Rising Star
Nominations:

Brownlow Medal tally

Club awards

Jack Dyer Medal

Michael Roach Medal

References

External links
2011 Richmond Tigers Fixtures
Richmond Tigers Official AFL Site
Official Site of the Australian Football League

Richmond Football Club seasons
Richmond Tigers